Woodbury Township is a township in 
Woodbury County, Iowa, United States.

References

Townships in Woodbury County, Iowa
Townships in Iowa